Chick most often refers to:

Chick (young bird), a bird that has not yet reached adulthood
 Chick, slang for a woman

Chick(s) may refer to:

People
 Chick (nickname), a list of people
 Chick (surname), various people
 Chick McGee, stage name of radio personality Charles Dean Hayes (born 1957)

Places
 Chick Island, in Lake Erie, Canada
 Chick Springs, Taylors, South Carolina, United States, a mineral spring

Arts, entertainment, and media

Films
Chick (1928 film), a British film
Chick (1936 film), a British film
Les Nanas (The Chicks), a 1985 French comedy film

Music
The Chicks, the current name of the band formerly known as the Dixie Chicks
The Chicks (duo), a New Zealand singing sibling duo, active in the 1960s
Chick, an alternative rock music project led by Mariah Carey
"Chick", a song by Brockhampton

Other
Chick (novel), a 1923 novel by Edgar Wallace
Chick, a Dutch pornographic magazine published by Joop Wilhelmus
"Chicks", an episode of the television series Teletubbies

Baseball teams
 Grand Rapids Chicks, a part of the All-American Girls Professional Baseball League from 1945 to 1954
 Lancaster Red Roses, formerly named the Lancaster Chicks in 1894–1895, based in Lancaster, Pennsylvania 
 Memphis Chicks (Southern Association), a former minor league team in Memphis, Tennessee, from 1901 to 1960
 Memphis Chicks (Southern League), a former minor league team in Memphis, Tennessee, form 1978 to 1997
 Milwaukee Chicks, in the All-American Girls Professional Baseball League in 1944
 Sumter Chicks, a former minor league team in Sumter, South Carolina

Other uses
 Chick's Deli, a deli located in Cherry Hill, New Jersey, United States

See also

 Chic (disambiguation)
 Chica (disambiguation)
 Chik (disambiguation)